*Agronā was a hypothetical reconstructed Proto-Celtic name for the River Ayr in Scotland, later applied to the River Aeron in Wales. The claim is linguistic and first appeared in William J. Watson's Celtic Placenames of Scotland (1926). Watson suggested the River Ayr in Scotland could be worked back to a hypothetical Proto-Celtic "river goddess of slaughter and carnage" and that the deity name was *Agronā. At that time there were many questionable Scottish nationalist attempts to use the River Ayr place-name to claim Taliesin’s battle poems for Scotland and Watson’s derivation strongly and implicitly supported such claims. This hypothesis has also been used to support locating the ancient kingdom of Aeron in modern-day Ayrshire.

Two years after Watson, Eilert Ekwall in his English River-Names (1928) instead derived the River Ayr simply from the root *Ara. However, the earlier claim that the river's name literally means "carnage" persisted. The alleged goddess even entered some encyclopedias and the derivation from "carnage" has since become casually conflated with the similarly-named Welsh river Aeron. However, in historical memory the opposite meaning for the River Aeron pertained, as Pughe's Dictionary of the Welsh Language states that the Aeron name for rivers in living Welsh meant "Queen of Brightness".

Trivia 
A South Wales black metal band shares the same name as the deity Agrona.

Notes

Bibliography
Berresford Ellis, Peter. Dictionary of Celtic Mythology (Oxford Paperback Reference), Oxford University Press (1994). 
MacKillop, James. Dictionary of Celtic Mythology. Oxford University Press (1998). .
Wood, Juliette, The Celts: Life, Myth, and Art, Thorsons Publishers (2002). 

Goddesses of the ancient Britons
Sea and river goddesses